Mark Santorelli (born August 6, 1988) is a Canadian former professional ice hockey left winger. His older brother Mike used to play for the Anaheim Ducks. They were teammates through the majority of the 2009–10 season with the Predators AHL affiliate, the Milwaukee Admirals.

Playing career
Santorelli was selected by the Nashville Predators in the fourth round, 119th overall in the 2007 NHL Entry Draft. In the 2006–07 WHL season, he led the Chilliwack Bruins of the Western Hockey League (WHL) in points with 82. Then, in the 2007–08 WHL season, he won the prestigious Bob Clarke Trophy as the league's top scorer with 101 points. Santorelli is the Chilliwack Bruins franchise leader in career assists, points, and games played.

On August 5, 2013, Santorelli moved to Italy from Sweden, signing a one-year contract with HCB South Tyrol, the newest accepted member of the Austrian Hockey League. In a surprising 2013–14 season, Santorelli was instrumental in helping Bolzano claim the EBEL Championship, posting 45 points in 54 games to become part of the first non-Austrian club to win the Austrian title.

On July 12, 2014, Santorelli left Bolzano for EBEL competitor, EC VSV on a one-year deal.

Career statistics

Awards and honours

References

External links

1988 births
Living people
Bolzano HC players
Ice hockey people from British Columbia
Canadian ice hockey left wingers
Chilliwack Bruins players
Cincinnati Cyclones (ECHL) players
Sportspeople from Burnaby
Milwaukee Admirals players
Nashville Predators draft picks
Tingsryds AIF players
VIK Västerås HK players
EC VSV players
Canadian expatriate ice hockey players in Austria
Canadian expatriate ice hockey players in Italy
Canadian expatriate ice hockey players in Sweden